The 2021 NBL–Pilipinas season, also known as the 2021 Chooks-to-Go NBL Chairman's Cup, is the fourth season of the National Basketball League (NBL) of the Philippines. It is also the first season of the NBL as a professional league as recognized by the Games and Amusement Board of the Philippine government. 

The inaugural pro league season opened on July 18, 2021 with 11 teams. However the league was suspended in July 30, 2021 due to stricter COVID-19 community quarantine imposed in Greater Manila. The NBL resumed play on September 18, 2021.

The Pampanga Delta clinched the 2021 NBL title at La Union Paower's expense.

Teams

Venue
Due to the COVID-19 pandemic in Metro Manila, the season was played in Bren Z. Guiao Convention Center in Pampanga, in a closed-circuit format, behind closed doors.

Elimination round

Results

Playoffs

Quarterfinals
The higher-seeded team has a twice-to-beat advantage. The lower-seeded team had to win over the other twice in order to advance to the semifinals. The higher seeded team only had to win once.

(3) Muntinlupa vs (6) Parañaque

(4) Bulacan vs (5) Taguig

Semifinals

(1) Pampanga vs (5) Taguig

(2) La Union vs (3) Muntinlupa

Finals

(1) Pampanga vs (2) La Union

See also
2021 WNBL–Philippines season

References

NBL
Basketball events postponed due to the COVID-19 pandemic